Frank Litsky (August 15, 1926 – October 30, 2018) was a sports columnist for The New York Times. Litsky started with the Times in 1958 and wrote more than 3,700 articles for the newspaper. He covered multiple sports, including track and field, and also served as the president of the New York Track Writer's Association from 1969 until his retirement in 2009.

Born in Waterbury, Connecticut, Litsky graduated from the University of Connecticut in 1946 at the age of 19.

References

External links
 Litsky's articles on The New York Times online archives

1926 births
2018 deaths
Sportswriters from New York (state)
The New York Times sportswriters
People from Waterbury, Connecticut
University of Connecticut alumni